Pelle Carlberg (born 21 October 1969) is a Swedish singer-songwriter. He is a member of the band Edson and also records and performs alone as a solo artist. His music video for Riverbank appeared on an in-game television in the video game The Darkness.

Discography

Albums
Everything. Now! (Twentyseven Records, 2 November 2005)
In a Nutshell (Twentyseven Records, 28 March 2007)
The Lilac Time (Twentyseven Records, 27 August 2008)

EPs
"Go to Hell, Miss Rydell" (Twentyseven Records, 16 March 2005)
"Riverbank" (Twentyseven Records, 19 October 2005)

Video game appearances
Pelle Carlberg's "Riverbank" music video can also be seen in the video game The Darkness.

Compilation appearances
"Go to Hell, Miss Rydell" (Labrador 100 – A Complete History of Popular Music, 2007)

References

Swedish male singers
Living people
Musicians from Uppsala
1969 births